San (trans. The Dream) was a Yugoslav rock band formed in Belgrade in 1971. San was formed by the composer Aleksandar "Sanja" Ilić. It disbanded in 1975, after the band's vocalist Predrag Jovičić died in concert from an electric shock.

Band history
The band was formed in 1971 by keyboardist and composer Aleksandar "Sanja" Ilić, who gathered former members of the beat bands Smeli, Samonikli, Bele Višnje and Vragolani. The band consisted of Ilić (keyboards), Predrag Jovičić (vocals), Aleksandar Slaviković (guitar), Dragoslav Jovanović (bass guitar) and Aleksandar Grujić (drums).

In 1971, the band released their first 7-inch single, featuring the songs "Tebe sam želeo" ("I Wanted You") and "Helena", through PGP-RTB. Two years later, the band released the single with the songs "Papirni brodovi" ("Paper Ships") and "Hej, malena" ("Hey, Little Girl"). In 1974, the band released three 7-inch singles: the first one featuring the songs "Legenda" ("Legend") and "Milena", the second one featuring the songs "Jedan svet za sve" ("One World for All") and "Srce na dlanu" ("Heart on a Sleeve"), and the third one featuring the songs "Anabela" and "Zvezda ljubavi" ("Love Star"). With the song "Legenda", the band won the Second Prize on 1974 Festival Omladina in Subotica. During these several years, Ilić wrote music for the film ITD (ETC.) and the rock opera Arhanđeli i automati (Archangels and Automatons) performed in Belgrade's Dadov Theatre.

On February 2, 1975, during a concert at Čair Hall in Niš, Jovičić died from an electric shock. Ilić decided to disband San and never to perform in a rock band again.

Post-breakup
After San disbanded, Ilić continued his career as a composer.

In 1975, the progressive rock band Pop Mašina released the song "Rekvijem za prijatelja" ("Requiem for a Friend") dedicated to Jovičić. The song lyrics were written by S Vremena Na Vreme member Ljuba Ninković.<ref>[http://www.discogs.com/Pop-Mašina-Na-Izvoru-Svetlosti/release/1294926 Pop Mašina - Na izvoru svetlosti at Discogs]</ref>

In 1977, former members of San, with the band Maj and the singers Zdravko Čolić, Dado Topić, Bisera Veletanlić, Zdenka Kovačiček and Zlatko Pejaković, recorded the album Uspomene (Memories) as a tribute to Jovičić.

In 1994, the song "Legenda" was released on Komuna compilation album Sve smo mogli mi: Akustičarska muzika (We Could Have Done All: Acoustic Music''), which featured songs by Yugoslav acoustic rock acts.

Discography

Singles
"Tebe sam želeo" / "Helena" (1971)
"Papirni brodovi" / "Hej, malena" (1973)
"Legenda" / "Milena" (1974)
"Jedan svet za sve" / "Srce na dlanu" (1974)
"Anabela" / "Zvezda ljubavi" (1974)

References

External links 
San at Discogs

Serbian rock music groups
Yugoslav rock music groups
Musical groups from Belgrade
Musical groups established in 1971
Musical groups disestablished in 1975